The Runyang Yangtze River Bridge is a large bridge complex that crosses the Yangtze River in Jiangsu Province, China, downstream of Nanjing. The complex consists of two major bridges that link Zhenjiang on the south bank of the river and Yangzhou on the north. The bridge is part of the Yangzhou–Liyang Expressway. Construction of the bridge complex began in October 2000 and was completed ahead of schedule. The bridge cost 5.8 billion Yuan (about US$700 million). The complex opened to traffic on April 30, 2005. In between the two bridges is the island of Shiyezhou.

Prior to the bridge's completion, round-the-clock ferry services operated across the river.  It took about 40 minutes to reach the Zhenjiang Railway Station from Yangzhou.
To this day, this nearby, round-the-clock ferry service operates across the river. The fee is approximately 15 yuan per small car, with a wait time of about 5 minutes. Cars and trucks drive directly onto the ferry boats before departure. Some locals estimate the ferries more quickly connect the city centers of Zhenjiang and Yangzhou.

South bridge
Upon its completion in 2005 it became the third longest suspension bridge span in the world and the largest in China. With the opening of the Xihoumen Bridge in 2007, it became the second longest span in China. It is now the ninth longest in the world. The two approach spans are not suspended.

Another planned suspension bridge across the Qiongzhou Strait in China, will be larger than the south bridge, spanning between 2,000 and 2,500 metres.

North bridge

See also
 List of bridges in China
List of longest suspension bridge spans
List of largest cable-stayed bridges
List of tallest bridges in the world
Yangtze River bridges and tunnels

References 
 News article from Peoples Daily Online
Article from construction.com
 — south bridge
 — north bridge

External links

Runyang Yangtze River Highway Bridge 

Bridges in Jiangsu
Suspension bridges in China
Bridges over the Yangtze River
Bridges completed in 2005
Cable-stayed bridges in China